An amniocyte (literally "lamb cell") is a cell of a fetus which is suspended in the amniotic fluid.

To study a person's chromosomes, it can be used in DNA-based analysis, via microscopic analysis of the cells in amniotic fluid. After circa 16 weeks of pregnancy the fluid can be collected. It then contains shed fetal cells, which are put in culture and grow out slow. After around 2 weeks of culture the cells should have divided enough for proper DNA analysis.

References

Animal developmental biology